San Maria Inter Vineas (St Mary Among the Vineyards) is a late-Romanesque and early-Gothic-style, Roman Catholic church located on Largo del Cremore in the town of Ascoli Piceno in the region of Marche, Italy.

History 
The church was begun in the 13th century, but the present church was altered over the centuries. The present main entrance is a façade on the right nave, which has both Romanesque and Gothic elements, and has a single portal. The belltower, detached from the church likely reutilizes a former private watchtower, now complete with mullioned windows. the interior is divided into a nave and two aisles by alternating pilasters and columns. A 1950–1954 restoration uncovered traces of 13th-century frescoes, including an Enthroned Madonna and Child between St John the Evangelist and St Michael the Archangel weighing souls. The church also houses the 15th-century, travertine marble tomb monument of Nicola Pizzuti, built as a gothic-renaissance style tabernacle, with frescoes of the school of Carlo Crivelli in the spandrels, depicting the Evangelists and Cardinal Virtues.

References 

Romanesque architecture in le Marche
Gothic architecture in le Marche
Roman Catholic churches in Ascoli Piceno
13th-century Roman Catholic church buildings in Italy